Dolichotis is a genus of the cavy family of rodents. These large relatives of guinea pigs are common in the Patagonian steppes of Argentina, but also live in Paraguay and elsewhere in South America.

The Chacoan mara has and sometimes still is also considered a member of this genus. However, a 2020 study by the American Society of Mammalogists found significant difference between the two mara species to warrant placing it in the genus Pediolagus.

Etymology 
Dolichotis means "long-eared" (from  "long" and  "ear") in Ancient Greek.

Species 
One extant and two extinct species of in this genus are recognized: 

Fossil species                                      
 †D. intermedia 
 †D. platycephala 

Fossils are known from Argentina:
 Montehermosan
 Andalhuala Formation
 Huayquerian
 Chiquimil Formation
 Chapadmalalan
 Barranca de los Lobos Formation
 San Andrés Formation
 Ensenadan
 Vorohué Formation
 Yupoí Formation
 Lujanian
 Luján Formation

Gallery

References 

Cavies
Extant Miocene first appearances
Articles containing video clips
Rodent genera
Taxa named by Anselme Gaëtan Desmarest
Mammal genera with one living species